Kenley is a civil parish in Shropshire, England.  It contains nine listed buildings that are recorded in the National Heritage List for England.  Of these, one is at Grade II*, the middle of the three grades, and the others are at Grade II, the lowest grade.  The parish contains the village of Kenley and the surrounding countryside.  The listed buildings consist of a church and its churchyard wall, and houses and cottages in or near the village.


Key

Buildings

References

Citations

Sources

Lists of buildings and structures in Shropshire